These are the singles that reached number one on the Top 100 Singles chart in 1994 as published by Cash Box magazine.

See also
1994 in music
List of Hot 100 number-one singles of 1994 (U.S.)

References
https://web.archive.org/web/20110818051853/http://cashboxmagazine.com/archives/90s_files/1994.html

1994
United States Cash Box Top 100
1994 in American music